Post Mills Airport  is a privately owned, public use airport in Orange County, Vermont, United States. It is located within the central business district of the Village of Post Mills.

Although most U.S. airports use the same three-letter location identifier for the FAA and IATA, this airport is assigned 2B9 by the FAA but has no designation from the IATA

Facilities and aircraft 
It has two turf runways designated 04/22, with a surface measuring 2,900 by 80 feet (884 x 24 m) and 05/23, with a surface measuring 2,300 by 80 feet (701 x 24 m).

For the 12-month period ending June 2, 2009, the airport had 4,333 aircraft operations, an average of 12 per day: 100% general aviation with a few air taxi and ultralights. At that time there were 33 aircraft based at this airport: 73% single-engine, 18% gliders and 9% ultralights. The latest activity there is their annual balloon festival where they have trained people operating the balloons. But also people who can create their own, register and sign up to try it out at the festival. It is undetermined yet if they will be holding in 2021, due to the ongoing Covid-19 pandemic and the fear that it would attract too many out-of-staters.

References

External links 
 Aerial photo as of April 1998 from USGS The National Map via MSR Maps
 

Airports in Vermont
Thetford, Vermont
Transportation buildings and structures in Orange County, Vermont